Championship Manager 93/94 is the second installment in the Championship Manager series of football management computer games. It was released a year after the original Championship ManagerNew features
This game improved on the original in many ways - by far the most significant change was the use of real player names for the first time. This was the one major feature which the game had lacked in comparison to its rivals.
Other key features to be introduced in this game included the following:

 A list of selected foreign-based players that could be bought
 Much more in-match commentary
 Injury time
 More player awards
 Eight different background pictures
 Improved loading times
 The implementation of the FA Premier League

Alternative versions
The CM93/94 engine was the basis for Championship Manager Italia. This was a version that simulated the top two divisions of Italian football (Serie A and Serie B). There was also a 1995 seasonal update released for this game.

The  1993/94 Season Data Up-Date Disk was a seasonal update disk that updated the game's database to reflect player and club changes for the 1993/94 season.

The End of 1994 Season Data Up-Date Disk was an end of season update disk that updated the game's database to reflect player and club changes for the end of 1993/94 season.

There was also a little-known Norwegian-language version called Championship Manager Norge or CM Norge which simulated the Norwegian League.

Trivia
 The Championship Manager '94 - End of Season Data Disk'', which was available on the Amiga, contained 2 fictional players added by a couple of people who worked on the game. The players were Mark Collis and Ferah Orosco. They were a striker and a defender, respectively, for Cambridge United in Division 3 and are regarded as the first ever fictional super-players in the CM series.

References

1993 video games
Amiga games
Domark games
DOS games
Multiplayer hotseat games
Association football management video games
Video games developed in the United Kingdom